Satish Prasad Singh (1 January 1936 – 2 November 2020) was an Indian politician. He was the Chief Minister of Bihar for a very brief tenure of just five days in 1968.

Biography
He was a member of Koeri community and his daughter Suchitra Sinha is married to Nagmani, the son of Jagdeo Prasad who was popularly known as "Lenin of Bihar".
Singh headed a coalition government led by Soshit Samaj Dal and supported by the Indian National Congress. He was elected to the 7th Lok Sabha (the lower house of the Parliament of India) from the Khagaria constituency of Bihar in 1980 as a member of the Congress Party. He was the first Chief Minister of Bihar who belonged to the other backward classes.

Singn joined the Indian National Congress in 1980 and was elected to the Lok Sabha in his very first attempt. He later joined the Bhartiya Janata Party in September 2013 but later quit the party after protesting against the poor representation of Kushwahas in the assembly tickets distribution.

Singh hailed from a prosperous family and owned more than 50 acre land. He married Gyan Kala, who belonged to another caste. The inter caste marriage being difficult in those days, they had to defy their parents in order to marry each other.

Death
Singh died in Delhi from complications of COVID-19 on 2 November 2020, 5 days after his wife died from the same disease.

References

|-

External links
Official biographical sketch in Parliament of India website

1936 births
2020 deaths
Chief Ministers of Bihar
Finance Ministers of Bihar
India MPs 1980–1984
Lok Sabha members from Bihar
People from Khagaria district
Chief ministers from Indian National Congress
Samyukta Socialist Party politicians
Deaths from the COVID-19 pandemic in India